Ja'afar Mahmud Adam (February 12, 1960 – April 13, 2007) was a Nigerian Salafist Islamic scholar and member of Nigeria's Jama’at Izalat al Bid’a Wa Iqamat as Sunna, a religio-political organisation based primarily in Kano with Maiduguri as a place for his Ramadan Tafsir.

Teaching
Adam preached in Maiduguri's Indimi Mosque, which was attended by the Deputy Governor of Borno.

Death
Sheikh Ja'afar was shot dead at his mosque during Subh prayer in the northern city of Kano in April 2007.

See also 

 Muhammad Auwal Albani Zaria
 Ahmad Abubakar Gumi
 Isa Ali Pantami
 Kabiru Gombe
 Sani Yahaya Jingir

References

1960 births
2007 deaths
Nigerian Sunni Muslims
Islamic University of Madinah alumni
International University of Africa alumni
Nigerian Salafis
Deaths by firearm in Nigeria
People from Kano
Nigerian Sunni religious leaders
Nigerian Muslim activists